Artocarpus chama is a tree in the family Moraceae: a wild species of the breadfruit/jackfruit genus (Artocarpus) and may be referred to as the 'chaplaish'; its Vietnamese name is mít nài (also used for other forest species).  Distribution records are from: Yunnan China, Bangladesh, Bhutan, India, Laos, Malaysia, Myanmar, Sikkim and Thailand.

References

External links 
 

chama
 Flora of Indo-China